Icehouse pieces, or Icehouse Pyramids, Treehouse pieces, Treehouse Pyramids and officially Looney Pyramids, are nestable and stackable pyramid-shaped gaming pieces and a game system. The game system was invented by Andrew Looney and John Cooper in 1987, originally for use in the game of Icehouse.

History
Andrew Looney in 1987 penned a sci-fi short story, "The Empty City", that included a game called Icehouse, an ancient Martian game. Readers requested to learn how to play the game. Thus actual rules were invented for Icehouse by Andrew Looney, Kristin Wunderlich (then future wife of Looney) and John Cooper, then plastic pyramid pieces were made to play the game. The first commercially available set were solid non-stackable pyramids released in 1989 with only 100 sets made. The pieces were made from resin in his apartment, which upset the landlord. After several years, Looney shut down Icehouse Games, Inc. and soon started another gaming company, Looney Laboratories, in 1996.

Additional games beyond Icehouse were created including Martian Chess, Zendo, and Homeworlds. Looney then created the IceTowers game which used stacking pyramids leading to a change in the pyramid pieces' specification for stacking. The four games were released as a part of Icehouse: The Martian Chess Set, which was the first Icehouse pyramid system release by Looney Labs. In 2001, Icehouse: The Martian Chess Set won the Origins Award for Best Abstract Board Game of 2000. Icehouse was recognized as a game system in the game design textbook Rules of Play by Katue Salen and Eric Zimmerman.

By June 21, 2002, Icehouse pieces were being sold in tubes containing a stash, or 15 pyramids of a single color, with nine colors available. Labs then released the book Playing With Pyramids, which contained a dozen games by the Looneys, Cooper, Kory Heath and Jacob Davenport.

In 2004, the Zendo boxed set won Best Abstract Board Game of 2003, In 2005 the set won the Mensa Select Game Award. While in 2007, Treehouse won the Origins Award for Best Board Game of 2006.

Looney Labs relaunched the Icehouse pieces as "Looney Pyramids" with new packaging with its IceDice set in June 2011 followed by Pink Hijinks in December 2012. By 2013, the IcehouseGames.org website listed 400 games playable with icehouse pyramids.

Original prototype under the name of Pyramid Throwdown in 2015, Pyramid Arcade was launched as a Kickstarter campaign on April 5, 2016. The new boxed pyramid set was funded in under 12 hours. Racking up $150 thousand total, the set shipped to supporters in fall 2016. Looney Labs put their Pyramid Quartet, Nomids, Ice Duo, Martian Chess and Homeworlds, together up on Kickstarter in February 2020, which was funded in three hours.

Description 

The pieces are four-sided pyramids that can nest and stack with pipping from 1 to 3 at the base.  A group of three pyramids, one of each size, is called a "trio." Each "stash" or set of Icehouse pieces consists of five trios, or fifteen pyramids (variously called pieces, pyramids, or minions) of the same color and five of each three sizes: five large 3-point pyramids (called "queens" in some games), five medium 2-point pyramids (sometimes called "drones"), and five small 1-point pyramids (or "pawns"). The stacked and nested feature is not used in the original Icehouse game, but is taken advantage of in some of the other Icehouse-based games listed below.

Icehouse pieces were, for many years, sold as tubes containing one stash of durable crystal-look plastic pieces in one of ten available colors (though cyan was only available through their promotional program or as part of the Ice Towers set).  There was also a less expensive starter set called Origami Icehouse (later called Paper Icehouse), made of cardstock in four colors, which one punched out and folded into the pyramid shapes. In 2006, Looney Labs began selling Icehouse pieces as Treehouse sets, which are multicolored sets of 15 pyramids: five colors, each color having one each of the three sizes.  Looney Labs has also sold boxed sets for Zendo and IceTowers; the latter contained cyan pieces. The Icehouse website also has instructions for making your own pieces. Looney Labs has licensed Crystal Caste to make regulation-sized Icehouse pieces out of semiprecious stone. Beginning with its Looney Pyramids relaunch set, IceDice, the sets are packaged in pyramid shaped nylon zipper bag until Pyramid Arcade.

Releases

standard colors: red, blue, green, yellow
Neon colors: purple, orange, lime green, and hot pink
alternate colors: cyan, clear, white, purple
original monochrome stash tubes colors: red, yellow, blue, green, purple, orange, black, white, clear
rainbow colors: red, dark blue, green, yellow, opaque black (standard plus black)
xeno colors: orange, purple, cyan, clear, white

Games

As a game system, Icehouse pieces can be used to play many different abstract strategy games. Most games need at least two colors, and some require other readily available equipment such as glass stones or a checkerboard.

References

External links 

 Official website
 Fan-run community website and comprehensive game listings
Board Game Geek pages
 Icehouse pieces 
 Looney Pyramids - Board game family page
 Rules for 13 games

 
Origins Award winners
Game equipment